The ABB Research Award in Honor of Hubertus von Gruenberg is named after Dr. Hubertus von Gruenberg, who was the Chairman of the Board of Directors of the technology company ABB from 2007 to 2015.

Endowment and format
Awarded every three years, the prize is endowed with a research grant of US$300,000.The prize is awarded to a postdoctoral researcher working in the fields of energy, manufacturing, transport, infrastructure, digitalization, or related fields. The grant enables the awardee to continue research on his or her topic for three years.

Purpose
The award was created to sustain high levels of research and encourage the development of future technologies and applications.

Awardees

2016 
Dr. Jef Beerten from KU Leuven for his PhD thesis on "Modeling and Control of DC Power Systems"

2019 
Dr. Ambuj Varshney from Uppsala University/University of California, Berkeley for his PhD thesis on "Enabling Sustainable Networked Embedded Systems"

Jury

2016  
The 2016 jury consisted of
 Prof. Robert Armstrong, Massachusetts Institute of Technology 
 Prof. Ulrike Grossner, Swiss Federal Institute of Technology in Zurich (ETH Zurich) 
 Prof. Nina Thornhill, Imperial College London
 Prof. Zheyao Wang, Tsinghua University, Beijing
 Bazmi Husain, ABB's Chief Technology Officer  
 Dr. Hubertus von Gruenberg, former ABB Chairman

2019 
The 2019 jury consisted of

 Prof. Nina Thornhill (Imperial College London)
 Prof. M. Granger Morgan (Carnegie Mellon University Pittsburgh)
 Prof. Roland Siegwart (ETH Zurich)
 Prof. C.L. Philip Chen (University of Macau, Taipa, Macau)
 Bazmi Husain, CTO of ABB
 Dr. Hubertus von Grünberg, former ABB Chairman

2022 
The 2022 jury consisted of

 Prof. Ambuj Varshney (National University of Singapore)
 Prof. Nina Thornhill (Imperial College London)
 Prof. Roland Siegwart (ETH Zurich)
 Prof. Manfred Morari (University of Pennsylvania)
 Dr. Bernhard Eschermann, CTO of ABB Process Automation
 Dr. Hubertus von Grünberg, former ABB Chairman

References 

Science and technology awards